Dionisio Mejia, popularly known as Guandulito, (March 23, 1911 – June 1979) was a Dominican Republic singer and accordion player, who helped popularize the merengue tipico genre.

Discography
 Guandulito y Su Conjunto (1960)
 Merengues (1960)
 Parranda En Sabana Iglesia (1960)
 En New York (1960)
 La Chiva Blanca de Don José (1960)
 Merengue Típico Dominicano Vol. 2 (1972)
 Merengues (1974)
 Haciendo Historia (with Wilfrido Vargas) (1979)

References

External links
 Rafael Chaljub Mejia, Antes de que te vayas: trayectoria del merengue folclorico, Grupo Leon Jimenes, 2005.
Guandulito Bio

Dominican Republic musicians
1911 births
1978 deaths
People from El Seibo Province